The Chinese Ambassador to India is the official representative from the People's Republic of China to India.

List of representatives
This is a list of diplomatic representatives from China to India. It includes envoys of the Republic of China (ROC) from 1946 to 1950, and those of the People's Republic of China (PRC) since 1950.

See also
 Embassy of China, New Delhi

References 

 
India
China